Adelophryne pachydactyla is a species of frog in the family Eleutherodactylidae. It is endemic to the coastal area of south-central Bahia state, Brazil. Some specimens first identified as A. pachydactyla have later been found to represent a new species, Adelophryne mucronatus; the two species can occur in sympatry. The specific name pachydactyla is derived from Greek pachys (=thick) and daktylos (=finger), referring to the thick, short, swollen fingers of this frog.

Description
Adelophryne pachydactyla was described based on a single specimen, the holotype. The head is slightly longer than it is wide. The snout is rounded. The tympanic annulus is incomplete, obscured by skin in its upper parts. There is no supra-tympanic fold and the canthus rostralis is indistinct. The limbs are relatively short. The fingers are short and have swollen, subdigital pads but no discs. The toes have small discs and no webbing. The body is blackish brown with grey spots dorsally and black under. The iris is reddish.

Habitat and conservation
Little is known of this species; the holotype was collected at night on a cacao farm under cacao trees, bananas, and some larger shade trees, found on the ground in the leaf-litter near a small creek. At another site they were collected in terrestrial bromeliads in a forest. The records are from below .

The probable threat to this species is habitat loss caused by agriculture, wood plantations, collection of bromeliads, and logging. It occurs in the Serra do Jequitibá Natural Heritage Reserve.

References

pachydactyla
Endemic fauna of Brazil
Amphibians of Brazil
Amphibians described in 1994
Taxonomy articles created by Polbot
Taxa named by Marinus Steven Hoogmoed